Belhaven may refer to:

Places

United Kingdom
Lord Belhaven and Stenton
Belhaven, Scotland
Belhaven Hill School, commonly referred to as "Belhaven"

United States

Belhaven, North Carolina
Alexandria, Virginia, formerly named Belhaven.
Belhaven University, a private, Christian university located in Jackson, Mississippi
Belhaven Neighborhood, a historic neighborhood in Jackson, Mississippi, named after the university

Businesses

Belhaven Brewery, a brewery based in Belhaven, Scotland